Community House may refer to:

South Africa
Community House (Salt River, Cape Town), a historic site declared as a provincial heritage site by Heritage Western Cape

United States
(by state then city)
Redbone Community House, Barnesville Georgia
Cornelia Community House, Cornelia, listed on the NRHP in Habersham County, Georgia
Community House (Winnetka, Illinois), NRHP-listed
Community House (Hamilton, Massachusetts), NRHP-listed in Essex County
Community House (Manhattan, Kansas), listed on the NRHP in Riley County
Whiting Memorial Community House, Whiting, listed on the NRHP in Lake County
Dexter Community House, Dexter, listed on the NRHP in Dallas County
Milliken Memorial Community House, Elkton, Kentucky
Morganton community House, Morganton, North Carolina
Sharp Street Memorial United Methodist Church and Community House, Baltimore, Maryland
Mills Community House, Benzonia, Michigan
Roosevelt Community House, Springfield, Michigan, listed on the NRHP in Calhoun County
Fort Sumner Community House, Fort Sumner, New Mexico, listed on the NRHP in De Baca County
Congregation B'nai Jeshurun Synagogue and Community House, New York City
Hamilton Park Community Houses, Staten Island, New York
St. Bartholomew's Church and Community House, New York City
Red Oak Community House, Red Oak, listed on the NRHP in Nash County
Rose Hill and Community House, Bay Village, listed on the NRHP in Cuyahoga County
New Market Township Community House, Hillsboro, listed on the NRHP in Highland County
William H. and Edgar Magness Community House and Library, McMinnville, Tennessee, listed on the NRHP in Warren County
Community House, First Congregational Church, Eau Claire, Wisconsin
Ripton Community House, Ripton, Vermont, listed on the NRHP in Addison County
Barcroft Community House, Arlington, Virginia